Bertrand Esther (born September 17, 1985) is a Seychellois football player.  He is a defender on the Seychelles national football team. He also plays for the Saint Louis Suns United.

References

External links

Living people
Seychellois footballers
1985 births
Place of birth missing (living people)
Association football defenders
Saint Louis Suns United FC players
Seychelles international footballers